Theatre Royal may refer to:

Theatres
 United Kingdom
Theatre Royal, Aldershot, Aldershot, built in 1891 and demolished in 1959
Theatre Royal, Aston, Birmingham, later Alpha Television 
Theatre Royal, Barnwell, Cambridge
Theatre Royal, Bath, Somerset
Theatre Royal, Birmingham (1774–1956; so named from 1807)
Theatre Royal, Brighton
Theatre Royal, Bristol
Theatre Royal, Bury St Edmunds
Theatre Royal, Cardiff, later known as  Prince of Wales Theatre, Cardiff
Theatre Royal, Covent Garden, London later Royal Opera House Covent Garden
Theatre Royal, Drury Lane, London
Theatre Royal, Dumfries
Theatre Royal, Edinburgh
Theatre Royal, Exeter
Theatre Royal, Glasgow
Theatre Royal, Gravesend
Theatre Royal, Hanley, Stoke-on-Trent (opened 1852, rebuilt 1871, 1887, 1894, 1951, closed 2000)
Theatre Royal, Haymarket, London
Theatre Royal, Hyde, Hyde, Greater Manchester (opened 1902, closed 1992)
Theatre Royal, Lincoln, England
Theatre Royal, Lichfield, former theatre on the site of the later Adelphi Cinema, Lichfield
Theatre Royal, Margate, Kent
Theatre Royal, Manchester, former theatre - now used as Royale nightclub
Theatre Royal, Newcastle, Newcastle upon Tyne
Theatre Royal, Northampton, later Royal & Derngate
Theatre Royal, Norwich, Norfolk
Theatre Royal, Nottingham
Theatre Royal, Plymouth, Devon
Theatre Royal, Portsmouth
Theatre Royal, St Helens
Theatre Royal Stratford East, Stratford, London
Theatre Royal, Wakefield
Theatre Royal, Windsor, Berkshire
York Theatre Royal, York

 Republic of Ireland
Theatre Royal, Cork 
Theatre Royal, Dublin
Theatre Royal, Waterford
Theatre Royal, Wexford

Belgium
Théâtre Royal de la Monnaie, Brussels
Théâtre Royal du Parc, Brussels

France
Théâtre Royal de Bourbon, Paris, destroyed in 1660

 Australia
Theatre Royal, Adelaide
Theatre Royal, Brisbane
Theatre Royal, Castlemaine, Victoria
Theatre Royal, Hobart, Tasmania
Theatre Royal, Melbourne
Theatre Royal, Sydney
Theatre Royal and Metropole Hotel, Perth

 Canada
Theatre Royal, Barkerville, British Columbia

 New Zealand
Theatre Royal, Christchurch, former name of the Isaac Theatre Royal
Theatre Royal, Nelson

Other uses
 Theatre Royal (Australian TV series), a Queensland/Australian television series
 Theatre Royal (film), a 1943 British comedy film
 Theatre Royal (TV series), a British/American television series

See also
 Theatre Royal disaster
Teatro Real, a major opera house in Madrid
 Teatro Regio (disambiguation)
 Royal Theatre (disambiguation)